Halechiniscus is a genus of tardigrades in the family Halechiniscidae. It was named and described by Ferdinand Richters in 1908.

Species
The genus includes 11 species:
 Halechiniscus chafarinensis Grimaldi de Zio & Villora Moreno, 1995
 Halechiniscus churakaagii Fujimoto, 2015
 Halechiniscus greveni Renaud-Mornant & Deroux, 1976
 Halechiniscus guiteli Richters, 1908
 Halechiniscus jejuensis Chang & Rho, 2002
 Halechiniscus macrocephalus Grimaldi de Zio, D’Addabbo Gallo & Morone De Lucia, 1988
 Halechiniscus paratuleari Grimaldi de Zio, D’Addabbo Gallo & Morone De Lucia, 1988
 Halechiniscus perfectus Schulz, 1955
 Halechiniscus remanei Schulz, 1955
 Halechiniscus tuleari Renaud-Mornant, 1979
 Halechiniscus yanakaagii Fujimoto, 2015

References

Publications
Richters (1908) Marine Tardigraden. [Marine Tardigrades] Zoologischer Anzeiger, vol. 33, p. 77-85 (integral text, archive).

Halechiniscidae
Tardigrade genera